Trifolium albopurpureum is a species of clover known by the common name rancheria clover.

It is native to the west coast of North America from British Columbia, California and the Sierra Nevada, to Baja California. It can be found in a wide variety of habitats, including chaparral and woodlands, grasslands, forests, and montane locales.

Description
Trifolium albopurpureum is an annual herb growing decumbent or erect in form. The leaflets are 1 to 3 centimeters long, and the herbage is hairy. The inflorescence is a spike of flowers measuring 0.5 to 2 centimeters wide. Each flower has a calyx of sepals with narrow lobes that taper into a bristle-shaped point and are coated in long hairs. Within the calyx is the flower corolla, which is purple and white in color.

Subspecies
Trifolium albopurpureum is often discussed as comprising three varieties.  These are:

Trifolium albopurpureum var. albopurpureum 
Trifolium albopurpureum var. dichotomum
Trifolium albopurpureum var. olivaceum

References

External links
Trifolium albopurpureum - Photo gallery

albopurpureum
Flora of the West Coast of the United States
Flora of California
Flora of Baja California
Natural history of the California chaparral and woodlands
Flora of the Sierra Nevada (United States)
Flora of the Cascade Range
Flora of the Klamath Mountains
Natural history of the Central Valley (California)
Flora without expected TNC conservation status